Armand Gaétan Razafindratandra (7 August 1925 – 9 January 2010) was a Cardinal Priest of the Roman Catholic Church and Archbishop of the Roman Catholic Archdiocese of Antananarivo, Madagascar.

Life
Born in Ambohimalaza, near Antananarivo, where his grandfather had been governor, Razafindratandra was educated at the parish school of Faravohitra. He went on to study at the minor seminary of Ambohipo and then at St. Michael's College, a Jesuit institution, before studying philosophy and theology at Ambatoroka.

Razafindratandra was ordained as a priest in 1954, after which he studied at the Catholic Institute in Paris for two years. Returning to Madagascar in 1956, he directed catechetical teaching and spiritual programs for public and private schools, working extensively with youth summer camp programs for children from needy families. He also rose to become Rector of the minor seminary at Faliarivo and the Director of the major seminary at Ambatoroka.

Appointed Bishop of Mahajanga in 1978 and named Archbishop of the Antananarivo Archdiocese in 1994, Razafindratandra was created Cardinal by Pope John Paul II in the consistory of 26 November 1994, and became the Cardinal Priest of the Titulus Ss. Silvestri et Martini in Montibus.

From 1997 to 2002, he was president of the Episcopal Conference of Madagascar. Razafindratandra was one of the cardinal electors who participated in the 2005 papal conclave that selected Pope Benedict XVI.

Armand Razafindratandra died on 9 January 2010.

See also
Catholic Church in Madagascar

References

External links
 Biography at catholic-pages.com
 Biographical data, Catholic Hierarchy

1925 births
2010 deaths
Malagasy cardinals
20th-century Roman Catholic archbishops in Madagascar
People from Antananarivo
Cardinals created by Pope John Paul II
Malagasy Roman Catholic archbishops
Malagasy Roman Catholic bishops
Roman Catholic archbishops of Antananarivo
Roman Catholic bishops of Mahajanga